La Renga is a 1998 album by the band La Renga. It contains the band's hits "El Revelde" and "El Twist del Pibe". The album does not have a name but the fans gave it the name of the band. The band members called it "the album of the star", because it has a big white star on the front cover. It achieved 3× platinum in Argentina for sales in excess of 180,000 copies.

Since this record, all the albums will come with special packages: cardboard, box sets, etc.

Track listing
All the songs by Gustavo Nápoli except "Me Hice Canción" (Sanchez/Vera)
 "El Terco" [The stubborn]
 "Tripa y Corazón" [Gut and heart]
 "Bien Alto" [So high]
 "El Hombre de La Estrella" [The man of the star]
 "Vende Patria Clon" [Sell clan homeland]
 "El Revelde" [The Revel]
 "Me Hice Canción" [I made myself song]
 "Cuando Estes Acá" [When you are here]
 "El Twist del Pibe" [The boy twist]
 "Reíte" [Smile]
 "Ser Yo" [To be me]

Personnel
Chizzo – lead vocals, lead guitar
Tete – bass guitar
Tanque – drums
Chiflo – saxophone, trumpet
Manu – saxophone, harmonica

Guest musicians
Pablo Lando – percussion (track 7)

Additional personnel
Gustavo Tabaré – recording technician, mixing
Washington Borner – recording technician, mixing
Chris Bellman – mastering
Gabriel Goncalvez – manager
Adrián Muscari – A&R

References

1998 albums
La Renga albums